The Great Walton Railroad  is a class III railroad that operates  of track in Georgia, United States. In addition to its own line between Monroe and Social Circle, Georgia, the railroad operates the Athens Line, LLC and the Hartwell Railroad.

Clay, feldspar, grain, machinery, fertilizer, woodchips, plastics, pulpwood, and silica are carried by the railroad, generating around 3,650 annual carloads.

History
The railroad between Social Circle and Monroe was originally constructed by the Walton Railroad beginning in 1880. In March 1884 the railroad was consolidated with the Gainesville, Jefferson and Southern Railroad and later leased to the Georgia Railroad.

Following acquisition by the Georgia Railroad the line continued to operate as a separate division, the Monroe Railroad, until 1917. The Georgia Railroad was merged into the Seaboard System Railroad in 1983, and CSX Transportation in 1986.

The branch from Social Circle to Monroe was sold to the Georgia Eastern Railroad in February 1987. On March 30, 1987, the Georgia Eastern sold the line to the Great Walton Railroad.

In addition to the Monroe branch, Norfolk Southern Railway leased a  branch from Covington to Shady Dale under the Thoroughbred Shortline Program to the Great Walton on April 10, 1989. The Covington line was transferred to the Squaw Creek Southern Railroad in 2008.

See also

 Hartwell Railroad
 Athens Line, LLC

References

External links
 Official website
 HawkinsRails.net Great Walton page

Georgia (U.S. state) railroads
Spin-offs of the Norfolk Southern Railway